The Coral Sea Islands Territory is an external territory of Australia which comprises a group of small and mostly uninhabited tropical islands and reefs in the Coral Sea, north-east of Queensland, Australia. The only inhabited island is Willis Island. Cato Island is the highest point in the Territory.

History and status 
The Coral Sea Islands were first charted in 1803. In the 1870s and 1880s the islands were mined for guano but the absence of a reliable supply of fresh water prevented long-term habitation. The Coral Sea Islands became an Australian external territory in 1969 by the Coral Sea Islands Act (prior to that, the area was considered a part of Queensland) and extended in 1997 to include Elizabeth Reef and Middleton Reef nearly 800 km further south.

The two latter reefs are much closer to Lord Howe Island, New South Wales, (about ) than to the southernmost island of the rest of the territory, Cato Island. The islands, cays and reefs of the Great Barrier Reef are not part of the territory, belonging to Queensland instead. The outer edge of the Great Barrier Reef is the boundary between Queensland and the Coral Sea Islands Territory.

The territory is a possession or external territory of Australia, administered from Canberra by the Department of Infrastructure, Regional Development and Cities. Previously it was administered by the Attorney-General's Department and the Department of Transport and Regional Services. Defence is the responsibility of Australia, and the territory is visited regularly by the Royal Australian Navy.

Australia maintains automatic weather stations on many of the isles and reefs, and claims a  exclusive fishing zone. There is no economic activity (except for a significant but as yet unquantified charter fishing and diving industry), and only a staff of three or four people to run the meteorological station on Willis Island (South Islet), established in 1921. In November 2011, the Australian government announced that a  protected area was planned in the Coral Sea.

The Supreme Court of Norfolk Island has jurisdiction over the islands; however, the laws of the Australian Capital Territory apply. The territory's FIPS 10-4 code is CR, whereas ISO 3166 includes it in Australia (AU).

In June 2004, a symbolic political protest run by gay rights activists based in Australia, declared the Coral Sea Islands to be a sovereign micronation. On 17 November 2017 the same group declared the kingdom to be 'dissolved', following the results of the Australian Marriage Law Postal Survey.

Geography 

There are about 30 separate reefs and atolls, twelve being wholly submerged or drying only during low tide, and 18 others with a total of about 51 islets and cays (18 alone on the atoll Lihou Reef), some of which are vegetated. The islands are all very low.

The Willis Islets are important nesting areas for birds and turtles but contain negligible natural resources. There is no port or harbour, only offshore anchorage.

Most of the atolls fall into two groups, while Mellish Reef to the east, and Middleton Reef and Elizabeth Reef to the south are grouped separately:

Northwestern Group
 Bougainville Reef (small submerged atoll, area  with lagoon, dries at half tide)
 Flora Reef (small submerged atoll, 5 by 4 km, about )
 North Moore Reef (small submerged atoll, 4 by 3 km, area  including lagoon that is open on the Northwest side)
 South Moore Reef (small submerged reef 5 km South of North Moore Reef)
 Magdelaine Cays & Coringa Islets (one large, partially sunken atoll structure, almost 90 by 30 km, bank area about ), 2 islets of the Magdelaine Cays in the North: North West Islet (area approximately ) and South East Cay (area ); 2 islets of the Coringa Islets 50 to 60 km further Southwest: Southwest Islet or Coringa Islet (area 0.173 km2), and Chilcott Islet (area 0.163 km2)
 Herald Cays, Northeast Cay (encircled by a reef of 3 by 3 km, total area 6 km2, land area 0.34 km2)
 Herald Cays, Southwest Cay (4 km Southwest of Northeast Cay, encircled by a reef of 2 by 2 km, total area 3 km2, land area 0.188 km2)
 Lihou Reef and Cays (largest atoll in the coral sea, with a size of 2500 km2, land area 0.91 km2)
 Diamond Islets & Tregosse Reefs (large, partially sunken atoll, 100 by 52 km, area of the bank over 3000 km2, with 4 islets and 2 small submerged reefs in the Northeast and Southeast: West Diamond Islet, Central Diamond Islet, East Diamond Islet on the Northeastern rim of the former atoll, and South Diamond Islet, East Tregosse Reef and West Tregosse Reef on the Southern rim)
 North Flinders Reef (large atoll, 34 by 23 km, area 600 km2, with 2 islets, Flinders Cay being the larger one with a length of 200 m and a height of 3 m)
 South Flinders Reef (atoll, 15 by 5 km, 60 km2)
 Herald's Surprise (small submerged reef North of Flinders Reefs, 3 by 2 km)
 Dart Reef (small submerged reef Northwest of Flinders Reefs, 3 by 3 km, area 6 km2 including small lagoon that is open to the North)
 Malay Reef (small submerged reef, not clearly defined, no breakers, difficult to see)
 Abington Reef (submerged reef, nearly awash, 4 by 2.5 km, area 7 km2)
 Marion Reef (large circular atoll formation that is composed of three main units located on the Eastern side: Marion, Long and Wansfell; and a number of smaller reefs on the west. The formation sits atop a submarine feature known as the Marion Plateau which is separated from the larger Coral Sea Plateau to the north by the Townsville Trough. Three small sand cays are located on the eastern side of Marion Reef: Paget Cay, on Long Reef, Carola Cay, south of Long Reef, and Brodie Cay, on Wansfell Reef.

The atolls of the Northwestern Group, except Osprey Reef and Shark Reef in the north, and Marion Reef in the south, are located on the Coral Sea Plateau (Queensland Plateau), a contiguous area of depths less than 1000 m.

 Flinders Reefs (North and South), Herald's Surprise and Dart Reef form a cluster of reefs of 66 by 26 km.
 Magdelaine Cays, Coringa Islets and Herald Cays are part of the 8856 km2 Coringa-Herald National Nature Reserve, created on 16 August 1982 and located around 400 km east of Cairns and 220 to 320 km from the outer edge of the Great Barrier Reef. The 6 islets of the nature reserve have areas from 0.16 to 0.37 km2, for a total of 1.24 km2.
 Lihou Reef was declared a Nature Reserve on 16 August 1982, with an area of 8440 km2.

The Nature Reserves were created to protect wildlife in the respective areas of the territory; together they form the Coral Sea Reserves Ramsar Site.

Mellish Reef

Mellish Reef, being about 300 km to the east of the Northwestern Group, thus the most distant from the Australian continent of all the reefs and atolls of the Coral Sea Islands Territory, is not considered to be part of any group. It has the outline of a boomerang-shaped platform around 10 km in length and 3 km across, area 25 km2. The surrounding reefs, which enclose a narrow lagoon, are completely submerged at high tide. Near the centre of the lagoon is the only permanent land of the reef - Heralds-Beacon Islet. The island is a small cay measuring 600 m by 120 m, area 57,000 m2, only rising a few ms above the high-water mark. The reef was discovered and named by Captain Alexander Bristow in the whaling ship  on 5 April 1812. The  wrecked on the reef on 16 August 1856.  erected the first beacon on the cay, using wreckage from Duroc.

Southeasterly Group
Frederick Reefs: The reefs form a semi-enclosed lagoon, known as Anchorage Sound, with an opening on the North side. The complex measures about 10 by 4 km, with an area of 30 km2. On the southern side of the reef lies Observatory Cay, the only permanently dry land, although there are a few of others cays that can be awash at high tide.
Kenn Reefs, submerged atoll of about 15 by 8 km, area 40 km2, islet Observatory Cay in the Southeast, 2 m high
Saumarez Reefs, southernmost reefs to be located on the Coral Sea Shelf; three main reefs and numerous smaller reefs that form a large crescent-shaped formation open to the northwest, about 27 by 14 km, area less than 300 km2. There are two sand cays: North East Cay and South West Cay.
Wreck Reefs: atoll 25 by 5 km, area 75 km2, open on the North. Islets found on the reefs include Bird Islet, West Islet and Porpoise Cay.
Cato Reef: Cato bank 21 by 13 km, area 200 km2 of depths less than 17 m; Cato Reef encircles an area of 3.3 by 1.8 km, area 5 km2 including lagoon; Cato Island, in the West of the lagoon, 650 by 300 m, area 0.15 km2, 6 m high. Close to the Southeast corner of Cato bank is Hutchison Rock, with 1 m depth over. Cato Island is the highest point in the Territory and a camp site on the Island called Heaven is the home of the Gay and Lesbian Kingdom of the Coral Sea Islands.

Extreme South
Elizabeth and Middleton reefs, together with reefs around Lord Howe Island (New South Wales) 150 km to the south, are regarded as the southernmost coral reefs in the world. Their location, where tropical and temperate ocean currents meet, contributes to an unusually diverse assemblage of marine species. These mostly submerged atolls which dry only during low tide were added to the territory only in 1989. They are located on the Lord Howe Rise. Already on 23 December 1987, they were protected as the Elizabeth and Middleton Reefs Marine National Park Reserve, which has an area of 1,880 km2.

 Elizabeth Reef, atoll about 8.2 km by 5.5 km, area 51 km2 including lagoon, one islet: Elizabeth Island (Elizabeth Cay), no vegetation, 600 m by 400 m (area 0.2 km2), highest point 0.8 m. At low tides, much of the reef flat is exposed.
 Middleton Reef, atoll about 8.9 km by 6.3 km, area 37 km2 including lagoon, one islet: The Sound, 100 m by 70 m (area 5,000 m2), highest point 1.5 m (close to the northern end). At low tides, much of the reef flat is exposed.

Overview of islets and cays

Man-made structures
Automatic, unmanned weather stations are located on the following reefs or atolls:

Bougainville Reef
Cato Island
Flinders Reef (Flinders Coral Cay)
Frederick Reef
Holmes Reef
Lihou Reef (Turtle Islet)
Marion Reef
Moore Reef

Lighthouses are located on following reefs or islands:

Bougainville Reef
East Diamond Islet
Frederick Reefs
Lihou Reef
Saumarez Reef

Willis Island, the only inhabited island, has a number of structures.

See also

 List of islands of Australia
 Gay and Lesbian Kingdom of the Coral Sea Islands

References

Notes

External links
 Coral Sea Islands History and the list of other Australia territories (Australian Government, Attorney-General's Department)

 
Landforms of the Coral Sea
Islands of Australia
States and territories established in 1969
1969 establishments in Oceania
IBRA regions